Bill Needham (January 12, 1932 – January 25, 2022) was a Canadian professional ice hockey forward and coach.

Playing career
Needham played for the following minor league teams during his career: Grand Rapids Rockets, Valleyfield Braves, Glace Bay Miners, New Westminster Royals, North Bay Trappers, Toledo Hornets and Cleveland Barons. He holds the franchise record of most games played for the Cleveland Barons, a total of 981, where he spent 15 seasons of his career. In this span, Needham scored 62 goals and 246 assists.

Later Life
Needham assumed the role of Coach-Player for the 1971/72 Toledo Hornets, but suited up to play in less than half of their games that year. From 1972-1974 he was the Cleveland Crusaders head coach in the World Hockey Association Goaltender Gerry Cheevers emerged as a star for The Crusaders, after several All-Star years with the NHL Boston Bruins. 

Needham died January 25, 2022, at the age of 90.

Coaching record

WHA

College

References

External links
 

1932 births
2022 deaths
Canadian ice hockey forwards
Cleveland Barons (1937–1973) players
Grand Rapids Rockets players
New Westminster Royals players
Southern Hockey League (1973–1977) coaches
Sportspeople from Kirkland Lake
Toledo Hornets players